Warren Township is a former civil township of Macomb County in the U.S. state of Michigan. Most of the township became the city of Warren.

History
The survey township forming the basis of the civil township, Township 1 North, Range 13 East, was initially part of Clinton Township (which was originally known as "Huron Township"). By an act of the Michigan Legislature on March 11, 1835, the townships of Hickory and Orange were set off from Clinton. Hickory then consisted survey township 1N13E, with the exception of the eastern row of sections, which were made part of Orange Township (later named Erin Township and that later became the cities of East Detroit, Roseville, Fraser, and St. Clair Shores.  On April 2, 1838, the township name was changed from Hickory to "Aba" (sometimes misspelled "Alba") and was increased by the additions of sections 1 and 12. On March 26, 1839, the name was changed to "Warren".

 It was named "Warren" after General Joseph Warren, who died at the Battle of Bunker Hill during the American Revolutionary War.

The community that later became the Village of Warren, began to be settled about 1830, before the formation of Warren Township. It was at first known as "Beebe's Corners" after John L. Beebe, who operated the toll gate on the plank road that led to Detroit.

The first landowner known to actually settle in the area is Charles Groesbeck in about 1830. He was soon joined by his brother Louis (the father of Michigan Governor Alex Groesbeck) and Charles Rivard.
 
A strap iron railroad, one of the first of its kind in Michigan, connected the settlement with Utica to the north and with Detroit to the south. The settlement was situated on the line between sections 4 and 5, at the junction of what are now known as Chicago Road and Mound Road.

Warren incorporated as a village in 1893. Another settlement grew a few miles to the south of the village of Warren. This settlement incorporated as the village of Center Line in 1925. Center Line became a city in 1936 and was no longer part of Warren Township. On October 27, 1956, Governor G. Mennen Williams signed the charter that incorporated the remainder of the township, including the village of Warren, as the city of Warren. The city of Warren began operations on January 1, 1957.

In 1920 Warren Township had a population of 3,564.  Its population had risen to 14,269 by 1930.  In 1935 Center Line, Michigan was incorporated as a city and detached from Warren Township.  Despite this loss of area, Warren Township had a population of 22,126 in 1940.

In 1950 Warren Township had a population of 42,653.  The part of Warren Township south of a line starting at the corner of Dequindre Road and Stephens running east on Stephens to Warner Street, south of Warner to Morrisey Street east on Morrissey to Ryan, north on Ryan to Eleven Mile, East on Eleven Mile essentially to the Center Line City line, then picking up again at the Railroad tracks and going north to Twelve Mile, then West to Mound, then following Mound to the boundaries of Warren, Michigan, then following the boundary of the Beverly Hills Golf Course (part of where the General Motors Technical Center is today) back to the rail tracks then going south on the railroad tracks back to 12 Mile Road (thus making the area of Warren Village connected to the rest of the Detroit Urban area only by katty-corner connection) then following 12 mile east to Van Dyke, Van Dyke south to Center Line, but incorporating a small area on the east side of Van Dyke.  The northern boundary of urbanized Warren picked up again at 10 mile road and went east along ten mile with some variations of no more than a half-mile to the north or south to what was then the East Detroit City line.

Communities
Base Line was a one-square mile area along the southern edge of the township.  It was named after Base Line Road, an old name for 8 Mile Road.  The area was platted in 1860 and received a post office in 1927.

Notes

References

Geography of Macomb County, Michigan
Defunct townships in Michigan